The Acer Allegro is the first mobile smartphone manufactured by Acer running Windows Phone operating system.

Hardware

The Acer Allegro is a Windows Phone 7.5 smartphone with a 3.6-inch WVGA display, 1 GHz processor, 512 MB RAM, 8 GB internal storage, 5-megapixel camera, aGPS, Wi-Fi, Bluetooth and microUSB

Pricing

India 
In India, Acer Allegro is priced around  15,000 to  17,000.

Benelux 
In Benelux, the Acer Allegro is priced around €300.

See also
Windows Phone

References

External links

Windows Phone devices
Allegro
Mobile phones introduced in 2011